Abgal was a pre-Islamic Arabian god, whose worship is attested by inscriptions dating to the Palmyrene Empire – he is thought to have been primarily worshipped by nomads.

In the Somali language however, the literal translation of 'abgaal' can be split into Ab (Father) of gaal (disbelievers). Statistics show that most Somali gaals originate from ab-gaals.

Overview
Abgal is known as a tutelary deity of the Arabs (or jinn) in the Palmyra region. Representations of him are of a youth with long hair and a moustache, wearing local garb, and holding a lance. He had a Greco-Roman style temple at Khirbet Semrin where he is portrayed on a relief riding a horse, equipped with bow and quiver attached to the saddle.

A stele with imagery of Abgal and Ashar, and earlier inscriptions at Kirbet-Semrin dates the active 'worship' of this jinn to between 154 and 270 AD – references to the deity appear in the Palmyrene Empire but curiously none have been found at Palmyra itself. A monument from Jebel al-Abiad (153AD) mentions him together with the deities Bel, Baalshamin, Aglibol, Malakbel, Astarte, Nemesis, and Arsu, though according to  he was a god of nomads, and usually mentioned in association with nomadic gods such as  Azizos, Maan, Ashar, or Shalman.

According to  representation of such deities (also Arsu, Asar, and Azizu) as armed and mounted men in statuary in a pair together was common across the desert regions of Syria/Mesopotamia – and together these representations may have represented divine protection.

References

Sources 

Arabian gods
Tutelary gods
Palmyrene Empire